Working in the Backroom is the sixth album by the British pop musician Howard Jones. It was released in 1993, and was the first album to be released on Dtox Records, Jones's own label. Jones sold over 20,000 copies of the album at his shows. Jones's parents often helped him sell the copies. He supported the album with a North American solo tour designated "The Synthesizer Tour"; The Fat Lady Sings opened some of the shows.

Production
Jones recorded and produced the album at his home studio. He spent about a year working on it.

Critical reception

The Washington Post wrote: "A collection of not-very-experimental experiments, the album sounds like mainstream Jones on such songs as 'Over & Above' and 'Left No Evidence'."

Track listing
All tracks composed by Howard Jones; except where indicated
"Cathedral of Chutai Excerpt" – 1:19
"Cookin' in the Kitchen" (Howard Jones, Andy Ross) – 4:58
"Over & Above" (Howard Jones, Andy Ross) – 4:48
"You Are Beautiful to Me" (Howard Jones, Andy Ross) – 4:52
"Left No Evidence" – 4:09
"You Can Say It's All Over" – 5:27
"Don't Get Me Wrong" – 7:10
"Blue" – 4:23
"Egypt Love Trance" – 5:20
"Let the Spirit Carry Me" – 4:17
"Cathedral of Chutai" – 4:05

References

1993 albums
Howard Jones (English musician) albums
Self-released albums